The Pugwash Conferences on Science and World Affairs is an international organization that brings together scholars and public figures to work toward reducing the danger of armed conflict and to seek solutions to global security threats. It was founded in 1957 by Joseph Rotblat and Bertrand Russell in Pugwash, Nova Scotia, Canada, following the release of the Russell–Einstein Manifesto in 1955.

Rotblat and the Pugwash Conference jointly won the Nobel Peace Prize in 1995 for their efforts on nuclear disarmament. International Student/Young Pugwash groups have existed since founder Cyrus Eaton's death in 1979.

Origin of the Pugwash Conferences

The Russell–Einstein Manifesto, released July 9, 1955, called for a conference for scientists to assess the dangers of weapons of mass destruction (then only considered to be nuclear weapons). Cyrus Eaton, an industrialist and philanthropist, offered on July 13 to finance and host the conference in the town of his birth, Pugwash, Nova Scotia. This was not taken up at the time because a meeting was planned for India, at the invitation of Prime Minister Jawaharlal Nehru. With the outbreak of the Suez Crisis the Indian conference was postponed. Aristotle Onassis offered to finance a meeting in Monaco instead, but this was rejected. Eaton's former invitation was taken up.

The first conference was held at what became known as Thinkers' Lodge in July 1957 in Pugwash, Nova Scotia. Twenty-two scientists attended the first conference:
 seven from the United States: David F. Cavers, Paul M. Doty, Hermann J. Muller, Eugene Rabinowitch, Walter Selove, Leó Szilárd, Victor Frederick Weisskopf
 three from the Soviet Union: Alexander M. Kuzin (Александр М. Кузин), Dmitri Skobeltsyn, Alexander V. Topchiev (Александр В. Топчиев)
 three from Japan: Iwao Ogawa, Shinichiro Tomonaga, Hideki Yukawa
 two from the UK: Cecil F. Powell, Joseph Rotblat
 two from Canada: Brock Chisholm, John S. Foster
 one each from Australia (Mark Oliphant), Austria (Hans Thirring), China (Zhou Peiyuan), France (Antoine M. B. Lacassagne), and Poland (Marian Danysz).
Cyrus Eaton, Eric Burhop, Ruth Adams, Anne Kinder Jones, and Vladimir Pavlichenko also were present. Many others were unable to attend, including co-founder Bertrand Russell, for health reasons. From the Soviet Union, Mikhail Ilyich Bruk (1923 Moscow - 2009 Jurmala) attended as an English-Russian technical translator. Later, Armand Hammer stated, "Mike's KGB."

Organizational structure

Pugwash's "main objective is the elimination of all weapons of mass destruction (nuclear, chemical and biological) and of war as a social institution to settle international disputes. To that extent, peaceful resolution of conflicts through dialogue and mutual understanding is an essential part of Pugwash activities, that is particularly relevant when and where nuclear weapons and other weapons of mass destruction are deployed or could be used."

"The various Pugwash activities (general conferences, workshops, study groups, consultations and special projects) provide a channel of communication between scientists, scholars, and individuals experienced in government, diplomacy, and the military for in-depth discussion and analysis of the problems and opportunities at the intersection of science and world affairs.  To ensure a free and frank exchange of views, conducive to the emergence of original ideas and an effective communication between different or antagonistic governments, countries and groups, Pugwash meetings as a rule are held in private.  This is the main modus operandi of Pugwash.  In addition to influencing governments by the transmission of the results of these discussions and meetings, Pugwash also may seek to make an impact on the scientific community and on public opinion through the holding of special types of meetings and through its publications."

Officers include the president and secretary-general. Formal governance is provided by the Pugwash Council, which serves for five years. There is also an executive committee that assists the secretary-general. Jayantha Dhanapala is the current president. Paolo Cotta-Ramusino is the current Secretary General.

The four Pugwash offices, in Rome (international secretariat), London, Geneva, and Washington D.C., provide support for Pugwash activities and serve as liaisons to the United Nations and other international organizations.

There are approximately fifty national Pugwash groups, organized as independent entities and often supported or administered by national academies of science.

The International Student/Young Pugwash groups works with, but are independent from, the international Pugwash group.

Contributions to international security
Pugwash's first fifteen years coincided with the Berlin Crisis, the Cuban Missile Crisis, the Warsaw Pact invasion of Czechoslovakia, and the Vietnam War. Pugwash played a useful role in opening communication channels during a time of otherwise-strained official and unofficial relations. It provided background work to the Partial Test Ban Treaty (1963), the Non-Proliferation Treaty (1968), the Anti-Ballistic Missile Treaty (1972), the Biological Weapons Convention (1972), and the Chemical Weapons Convention (1993). Former US Secretary of Defense Robert McNamara has credited a backchannel Pugwash initiative (code named PENNSYLVANIA) with laying the groundwork for the negotiations that ended the Vietnam War. Mikhail Gorbachev admitted the influence of the organisation on him when he was leader of the Soviet Union. In addition, Pugwash has been credited with being a groundbreaking and innovative "transnational" organization and a leading example of the effectiveness of Track II diplomacy.

During the Cold War, it was claimed that the Pugwash Conference became a front conference for the Soviet Union, whose agents often managed to weaken Pugwash critique of USSR and instead concentrate on blaming the United States and the West.  In 1980, the House Permanent Select Committee on Intelligence received a report that the Pugwash Conference was used by Soviet delegates to promote Soviet propaganda. Joseph Rotblat said in his 1998 Bertrand Russell Peace Lecture that there were a few participants in the conferences from the Soviet Union "who were obviously sent to push the party line, but the majority were genuine scientists and behaved as such".

Following the end of the Cold War, the traditional Pugwash focus on decreasing the salience of nuclear weapons and promoting a world free of nuclear weapons and other weapons of mass destruction addresses the following issue areas:

Nuclear stability, nuclear disarmament and non-proliferation: 1. Traditional Nuclear Disarmament, US-Russia nuclear disarmament, nuclear weapons in Europe; 2. Nuclear weapons and nuclear proliferation in the Middle East, Israeli nuclear weapons, Iranian nuclear program, proposal for a Middle Eastern zone free of weapons of mass destruction, Arab attitudes towards nuclear weapons and nuclear proliferation; 3. India and Pakistan nuclear relations, the effects of US India nuclear deal; 4. North Korea.
Regional security in regions where nuclear weapons exist or risks of nuclear proliferation are significant:  1. Middle East—general issues, the impact of the Palestinian problem and its relevance in the Arab world, the consequences of the so-called Arab spring and the growth of the Islamic movements and parties, Arab-Iranian, Arab-Israeli and Iran-Israeli relations; 2. South-Central Asia—traditional antagonism between India and Pakistan, the role of terrorist attacks in the worsening of such antagonism, US-Pakistani relations in general. The role of radical movements in Pakistan, reconciliation and peace in Afghanistan, talking to the Taliban (is it possible and how should be done?), Pakistani-Afghan relations.

The Pugwash movement has also been concerned with environmental issues and as a result of its 1988 meeting in Dagomys it issued the Dagomys Declaration on Environmental Degradation.

Nobel Peace Prize
In 1995, fifty years after the bombing of Nagasaki and Hiroshima, and forty years after the signing of the Russell–Einstein Manifesto, the Pugwash Conferences and Joseph Rotblat were awarded the Nobel Peace Prize jointly "for their efforts to diminish the part played by nuclear arms in international politics and, in the longer run, to eliminate such arms." The Norwegian Nobel committee hoped that awarding the prize to Rotblat and Pugwash would "encourage world leaders to intensify their efforts to rid the world of nuclear weapons." In his acceptance speech, Rotblat quoted a key phrase from the Manifesto: "Remember your humanity."

International Foundation for Science
From the 1965 Pugwash conference came a recommendation to establish the International Foundation for Science "in order to address the stultifying conditions under which younger faculty members in the universities of developing countries were attempting to do research". The organization gives grants to early-career scientists in low-income countries for work on local water resources and biology.

Secretaries General
 Joseph Rotblat : 1957–1973
 Bernard Feld : 1973–1978
 Martin Kaplan : 1978–1989
 Francesco Calogero : 1989–1997
 George Rathjens : 1997–2002
 Paolo Cotta-Ramusino : 2002–

Pugwash Presidents
As of 2019, 13 individuals have served as Presidents of the Pugwash Conferences.
Earl (Bertrand) Russell, 1950 Nobel Prize in Literature, a founder of the movement, was its natural head in its initial years. The formal office of the presidency was established at the Quinquennial Conference in Ronneby, in 1967. The president's role was to "preside over the Annual Pugwash Conferences and, in addition, between Conferences, to offer his counsel and advice to the members of the Continuing Committee and the Secretary-General, and thereby assist them in the execution of the activities of the Movement."
Sir John Cockcroft, joint recipient of the 1951 Nobel Prize in Physics for pioneering work on the transmutation of atomic nuclei by artificially accelerated atomic particles, was elected as the first president in 1967, though he died suddenly ten days later.
Lord Florey, who shared the 1945 Nobel Prize in Physiology or Medicine for extraction of penicillin, was then invited to become president, though he also died within weeks. At that point the Continuing Committee decided to have a rotating presidency for a term of one year, to have that office held by a distinguished person in the country where the annual conference would be held each year.
Francis Perrin (1968), had worked with Frederic Joliot's team to establish in 1939 the possibility of nuclear chain reactions and nuclear energy production.
Mikhail Millionshchikov (1969), an eminent physicist who later became Speaker of the Russian Parliament.
Eugene Rabinowitch (1970), American biophysicist who worked on the Manhattan Project and was co-author with Leo Szilard of the Franck Report and co-founder in 1945 of the Bulletin of the Atomic Scientists. In September 1970, the Continuing Committee switched back to the initial idea of a permanent office of president, with a five-year term.
Hannes Alfvén (1970–1975), recipient of the 1970 Nobel in Physics for work on his theory of magnetohydrodynamics.
Dorothy Crowfoot Hodgkin (1976–1988), recipient of the 1964 Nobel Prize in Chemistry for her determinations by X-ray techniques of the structures of important biochemical substances.
Sir Joseph Rotblat (1988–1997), physicist, one of the founders of the Pugwash Movement, co-recipient of the 1995 Nobel Peace Prize.
Sir Michael Atiyah (1997–2002), a mathematician, was awarded the 1966 Fields Medal, for his work in developing K-theory.
Prof. M.S. Swaminathan (2002–2007), agricultural scientist, one of the pioneers of the Green Revolution and recipient of the World Food Prize and the UNESCO Gandhi Prize.
Amb. Jayantha Dhanapla (2007–2017), former Under-Secretary-General for Disarmament Affairs at the United Nations (1998–2003), and former Ambassador of Sri Lanka to the US (1995–97) and to the UN Office in Geneva (1984–87)
Amb. Sergio Duarte (2017–), former UN Undersecretary for Disarmament Affairs and a retired career diplomat from Brazil

Pugwashites
The Pugwash Conference itself does not have formal membership (although national organisations do). All participants take part in their individual capacities and not as representatives of any organization, institution or government.  Anyone who has attended a meeting is considered a "Pugwashite".  There are more than 3,500 "Pugwashites" worldwide.

Pugwash Council for the 2007–2012 Quinquennium

Amb. Jayantha Dhanapala (President), former UN Under-Secretary-General
Prof. Paolo Cotta-Ramusino (Secretary General), Professor of Theoretical Physics, University of Milano (Italy)
Amb. (ret.) Ochieng Adala, former Perm Rep of Kenya to the United Nations in New York.
Amb. Sergey Batsanov, Director, Geneva Pugwash, former Rep of the USSR/Russia to CD
Dr. Adele Buckley, fmr VP of Tech, Ontario Centre for Enviro Tech Advancement.
Prof. Francesco Calogero (Fmr Sec Gen), Prof, Theoretical Physics, Univ of Rome "La Sapienza".
Dr. Lynn Eden, Center for International Security and Cooperation, Stanford Univ.
Prof. John Finney, Emeritus Prof of Physics, University College London.
Prof. Galia Golan-Gild, Professor of Govt, Interdisciplinary Center (IDC), Herzliya, Israel.
Prof. Karen Hallberg, Prof of Physics, Fellow, Argentine Natl Council, Science & Tech
Dr. Peter Jones, fmr sr Policy Advisor, Sec & Intell Secretariat, Ottawa (PM's Department).
Gen. (ret.) Dr. Mohamed Kadry Said, Head of the Military Studies Unit, Al-Ahram Center
Dr. Mustafa Kibaroglu, Chair of the International Relations, Okan University Tuzla, Turkey 
Mr. Cliff Kupchan, Director of Europe and Asia of the Eurasia Group, Washington, DC
Mr. Sverre Lodgaard, former Director, Norwegian Institute of International Affairs 
Prof. Saideh Lotfian (Council Chair), Assoc Prof, Political Science, University of Tehran.
Dr. Riad Malki, Min. of Foreign Affairs, Min. of Information, Palestinian Natl Authority.
Amb. Miguel Marin-Bosch, former Deputy Foreign Minister of Mexico.
Gen. (ret.) Talat Masood, former Secretary, Defence Production Division, MOD
Prof. Amitabh Mattoo Professor of International Relations and Member, National Knowledge Commission
Dr. Steven Miller (Chair of Executive Committee), International Security Program of the Belfer Center, Harvard University 
Prof. Götz Neuneck, Institute for Peace Research and Security Policy (IFSH), Hamburg.
Dr. Alexander Nikitin, Director of the Center for Political and International Studies 
Mr. Niu Qiang, Secretary General, Chinese People's Assoc for Peace and Disarmament
Gen. Pan Zhengqiang, Deputy Chair, China Foundation of International Studies
Acad. Yuri Ryzhov, President, International Engineering University, Moscow
Prof. Ivo Slaus, former Member of the Croatian Parliament 
Dr. Mark Byung-Moon Suh, Chair, Corea Trust Fund 
Prof. Takao Takahara, Professor of International Politics and Peace Research, Faculty of International Studies, Meiji Gakuin University, Japan
Dr. Bob van der Zwaan, Senior Scientific Researcher, Energy Research Center of The Netherlands

Other Pugwashites

 Syed Azeez Pasha
 Ruth Adams
 Raymond Aubrac
 Lev Artsimovich
 Frank Barnaby
 Ana Maria Cetto
 Carl Djerassi
 Paul M. Doty
Bernard T. Feld
 Shalheveth Freier
 John Holdren
George Ignatieff
 Frédéric Joliot-Curie
 Peter Kapitza
Sergey Kapitsa
 Patricia Lindop
 Robert K. Logan
 Robert McNamara
 Wolfgang K. H. Panofsky
 Bas Pease
 John Charles Polanyi
 Isidor Isaac Rabi
 Martin Rees
 Sherry Rehman
 Andrei Sakharov
 M. Shamsher Ali
 Hussain al-Shahristani
 Ali Asghar Soltanieh
 Ivan Supek
 Igor Tamm
 Herbert York
 Victor Weisskopf
 Walter Dorn

Legacy
As the birthplace of the Pugwash movement, the Thinkers' Lodge was designated a National Historic Site of Canada in 2008.

Jubilee Pugwash Conference Astana
The Jubilee 62nd Pugwash Conference devoted to nuclear disarmament was held in Astana, the capital of Kazakhstan, in 2017. The conference celebrated the 60th anniversary of the first Pugwash Conference, held in Pugwash, Nova Scotia in 1957. The theme of the conference was "Confronting New Nuclear Dangers." The conference agenda focused on strengthening the nuclear test ban and combating terrorism.

The Astana conference working groups included:
 Nuclear disarmament and the UN negotiation process to prohibit nuclear weapons
 Nuclear non-proliferation, civilian nuclear energy and energy security
 Regional Security: Europe and NATO
 Regional Security: Middle East
 Regional Security: South Asia (Afghanistan, Pakistan, India)
 Regional Security: Northeast Asia
 Emerging new technologies and security issues (Cyber Security, AI, Robot)

See also

 List of anti-war organizations
 List of peace activists
 Student Pugwash USA
 International Student/Young Pugwash
 Nuclear Weapons: The Road to Zero
 Soviet influence on the peace movement
 International Campaign to Abolish Nuclear Weapons
 Anti-nuclear organizations
 List of books about nuclear issues
 List of films about nuclear issues
 Captain Pugwash

Notes

References

Books

External links

 Pugwash Conferences on Science and World Affairs
 Russia: Russian Pugwash Committee
 Canada: Canadian Pugwash Group -see: 
 France: Association Française pour le Mouvement Pugwash
 The First Pugwash Conference.
 
 Profile of Joseph Rotblat
 The Early Days of Pugwash, by Joseph Rotblat in Physics Today, June 2001.
 Pugwash And The International Treaties On Chemical And Biological Warfare, by J.P. Perry Robinson.
 Pugwash Conferences on Science and World Affairs (Rome, through 1996 only)
 The Dagomys Declaration on Environmental Degradation.
 J. Rotblat, Scientists in the Quest for Peace: A history of the Pugwash Conferences, MIT Press,1972.

 
Anti–nuclear weapons movement
International scientific organizations
Organizations awarded Nobel Peace Prizes
International nongovernmental organizations
International organisations based in Italy
Ethics of science and technology
International security
Organisations based in Rome
Non-profit organisations based in Italy
Scientific organisations based in Italy
Scientific organizations established in 1957
1957 establishments in Canada
Buildings and structures in Nova Scotia
1957 in Nova Scotia
Existential risk organizations